Pahikore Te Koeti Tūranga (18 November 1883 – 13 March 1964), also known as John Butler Te Koeti, was a notable New Zealand  mountaineer, guide, bushman, axeman. Of Māori descent, he identified with the Ngāi Tahu and Ngāti Māmoe iwi. He was born at Makaawhio Pā, West Coast, New Zealand in 1883.

He died in Hokitika in 1964 and was buried in Hokitika Cemetery.

References

1883 births
1964 deaths
New Zealand mountain climbers
Kāti Māmoe people
Ngāi Tahu people
Burials at Hokitika Cemetery
New Zealand Māori sportspeople
New Zealand woodchoppers